Goodbye June is a rock band from Nashville, Tennessee. The band is composed of cousins Landon Milbourn (lead vocals, tambourine), Brandon Qualkenbush (rhythm guitar, bass, drums, backing vocals), and Tyler Baker (lead guitar).

History 
Goodbye June was formed after the death of lead guitarist Tyler Baker's brother. Eventually named Goodbye June in memory of Baker's brother who passed in June, the band released their independent debut album Nor The Wild Music Flow on CVR in 2012, followed by Magic Valley on Cotton Valley Music / Interscope Records in May 2017, Community Inn in 2019, and See Where The Night Goes in 2022, both on Earache Records / Cotton Valley Music.

The band has toured throughout the United States as well as the UK, Germany, Sweden, Finland, The Netherlands, Norway, Sweden, Belgium, France, and Spain.

Goodbye June's music has been used in Madden 17, NFL, WWE and ESPN College Football broadcasts among others.

Goodbye June achieved a US Top 30 Mainstream Rock single with "Oh No" in 2016. In 2022, their album See Where The Night Goes achieved a #33 placement in the UK Albums Chart and a #1 position in the UK Rock Chart. They also achieved a Top 20 in the Offizielle Deutsche Charts with See Where The Night Goes, debuting at #20. On the Billboard charts they placed at #12 on the Current Hard Music chart, #18 on the Top New Artist chart and #128 on the Billboard 200 chart.

Musical style
Influenced by AC/DC, Led Zeppelin, Kings of Leon, The Black Keys, Jimi Hendrix among many other rock bands, Goodbye June's music has been described as "blues-infused rock with hard-driving beats, blistering guitars, and down and dirty vocals"

Discography

Studio albums
Nor The Wild Music Flow (2012-2013 / CVR)
Magic Valley (2017 / Cotton Valley Music / Interscope Records)
Community Inn (2019 / Earache Records / Cotton Valley Music)
See Where The Night Goes (2022 / Earache Records / Cotton Valley Music)

Extended plays
Danger In The Morning (2016 / Interscope Records)
Secrets In The Sunset (2018 / Suretone / Cotton Valley Music)

Singles

Videos

Members
Current
Landon Milbourn: Lead Vocals, Acoustic Guitar
Tyler Baker: Lead Guitar, Vocals
Brandon Qualkenbush: Guitars (Rhythm/Bass), Vocals

See also
List of alternative rock artists

References

Alternative rock groups from Tennessee
Musical groups established in 2009
Musical groups from Nashville, Tennessee
American musical trios
2009 establishments in Tennessee